Eugène Charles Miroy (November 12, 1828 – February 12, 1871), also known as Abbé Miroy, was a French Catholic priest who was executed by the Prussian military during the armistice following the Franco-Prussian War.

Miroy was the Curate of Cuchery.  Following the signature of the armistice agreement, Prussian forces accused Miroy of having sheltered Francs-tireurs in his rectory, and of having hidden armaments in the altar of his church.

Miroy is buried in the Cimitière du Nord in Reims, beneath a bronze recumbent statue sculpted by René de Saint-Marceaux.  His tomb became a symbol of the French Resistance, and the municipality of Reims lays a wreath upon his grave at the annual commemoration of the liberation of the city.

References

1828 births
1871 deaths
19th-century French Roman Catholic priests